Cochlefelis is a genus of sea catfishes found in coastal and freshwaters from Southeast Asia to Australia. There are currently four described species in this genus.

Species
 Cochlefelis burmanicus (F. Day, 1870)
 Cochlefelis danielsi (Regan, 1908) (Daniel's catfish)
 Cochlefelis insidiator (Kailola, 2000) (Flat catfish)
 Cochlefelis spatula (E. P. Ramsay & J. D. Ogilby, 1886) (Duckbilled catfish)

References
 

Ariidae
Catfish genera
Taxa named by Gilbert Percy Whitley